Tolland High School is a public high school in Tolland, Connecticut.

Overview
In 1969, Tolland High School (THS) opened as the first all electric high school in Connecticut. In its first year, there were only three grades: 9th, 10th, and 11th.

In 2002, the Tolland Board of Education recommended the construction of a new building for THS. Voters approved the $56.6 million construction in June 2003 with a vote of 2,302 to 2,083. In 2006, THS moved to a new building on the same road. Improvements over the old building included a larger auditorium, new furniture, new sports fields, and a technology wing.

According to U.S. News & World Report, there are 828 enrolled as of April 2017, resulting in a student-teacher ratio of 14:1. Tolland High School has a graduation rate of 98%

Tolland Alternative Learning Center (TALC) 
The Tolland Alternative Learning Center (TALC) is an alternative education program at the Tolland High School that helps struggling students graduate high school, initiated in January 2004. The students take classes from 3pm-7pm.

Notable alumni
Daniel C. Burbank, astronaut
David Passaro, contractor for the Central Intelligence Agency
Jennifer K. Sweeney, poet
Barry Wood, architect, model, and star of TLC's Trading Spaces

References

External links 
 

Tolland, Connecticut
Schools in Tolland County, Connecticut
Public high schools in Connecticut